The Dungeons Are Calling is an EP by the American heavy metal band Savatage, released in 1985 on Combat Records. Though the EP was not released until 1985, most of the songs featured on it and the debut album, Sirens, had been in the band set list since 1979, and are part of the Live in Clearwater and City Beneath the Surface EPs. The Dungeons Are Calling is a loosely based concept album and the title track, contrary to popular belief, is not about Hell or torture, but about the horrors of drug use. The song used many metaphors, which have been sometimes misunderstood.

The tracks on this EP were recorded the same day as the tracks for the Sirens album. The two were meant to be a full-length debut but were divided due to limited space for songs on vinyl. The two were released together in 2011 for the first time "as they were meant to be" (Jon Oliva).

The cover is a picture of a human skull with a homemade syringe, a reference to the title track of the album.

Critical reception

In 2005, The Dungeons Are Calling was ranked number 349 in Rock Hard magazine's book The 500 Greatest Rock & Metal Albums of All Time.

Track listing

Personnel
Savatage
Jon Oliva – lead vocals
Criss Oliva – guitars, backing vocals
Keith Collins – bass guitar, backing vocals
Steve Wacholz – drums, percussion

Production
Danny Johnson – producer
Jim Morris – engineer
Mike Fuller – mastering
Eddy Schreyer – re–mastering
Robert Zemsky – management

Charts

References

External links
Dungeons Are Calling at official Savatage website

1984 EPs
Combat Records albums
Music for Nations albums
Savatage albums